Semaja Render, known professionally as Lil Gotit, is an American rapper and singer.

Early life 
Semaja Zair Render was born in Atlanta, Georgia, the youngest of seven children. Render was initially raised in Forest Park on Southside Atlanta's Conley Road. After dropping out of high school during his freshman year, Render moved to Cleveland Avenue. Like his late brother and fellow rapper Lil Keed, who was one year older, Gotit did not start taking rap seriously until his friend Rudy was killed a few days before the release of the group compilation mixtape Young Slime Season in 2016.

Gotit then began releasing songs with his brother Lil Keed, whom he collaborated with on the songs: "Trap Bunkin", "Dirty Dancer" and "All Season". Described as one of Atlanta's next rising rap stars, his music was starting to be played in clubs. The name Lil Gotit was derived from Maja Gotit, a nickname inspired by him "having everything".
He has cited Young Thug as his mentor.

Career

2018–2019: Beginnings, Hood Baby and Crazy But It's True 
Gotit has collaborated with Keed and Lil Uzi Vert for the song "Heavy Metal". In November 2018, he worked with Lil Uzi Vert again to release the song "Hercules". He has also released the song "Superstar" with Gunna. Gotit released his debut studio album Hood Baby via Alamo Records, consisting of 18 singles including "Loco" and "Small Todger". The album, produced by Yung Lan, was released on November 16, 2018. The album featured singles including "Blue Slimes" featuring Gunna, Skooly and Lil Keed as well as "Drip Severe". On March 14, 2019, Lil Gotit released his second studio album, Crazy But It's True. The project had features from artists including Gunna, Wali Da Great, Lil Keed and Lil Durk.

On March 29, 2019, Gotit released a music video for his single "Drop The Top" featuring Lil Keed. On April 11, 2019, Gotit released his single "Never Met" with a music video. On May 2, 2019, Gotit released his single "Lil Ralph" accompanied with a music video. On May 8, 2019, Famous Dex released an audio for a new song "Fully Loaded" featuring Lil Gotit. A music video for Fully Loaded was released later on May 29, 2019. On the same day animation video of Gotit's single "Da Real HoodBabies (Remix)" featuring Lil Baby was also released. On July 1, 2019, Gotit released his single "Pop My Shit", the song was accompanied with a music video, along with a remix featuring Lil Keed that later released on August 20. On August 7, 2019, Gotit released his single "Oh Ok" accompanied with a music video.

2019–present: The Real Goat, Hood Baby 2, Top Chef Gotit, and The Cheater 
On August 22, 2019, Gotit announced the release of his third studio album Hood Baby 2. On September 5, 2019, Gotit released his new mixtape The Real Goat featuring 16 new songs. The mixtape was released after his previous announcement of releasing his forthcoming album Hood Baby 2 later in the year. On September 12, 2019, Gotit released a music video for the remix of "Da Real Hood Babies" featuring Lil Baby. On October 9, 2019, Gotit released a music video for his The Real Goat song "No Talking" featuring Slimeball Yayo.

On January 30, 2020, Lil Gotit's collaborative single "A'Team (You Ain't Safe)" along with Lil Yachty, Lil Keed, and Zaytoven was released. It was the second single released off their forthcoming collaborative album "A-Team". On February 6, 2020, Lil Gotit released his single "Bet Up" and announced his forthcoming project Superstar Creature, executive produced by London on da Track. On February 12, 2020, Gotit released his Zaytoven produced single "Drip Jacker".

On April 9, 2020, Gotit released the single "Bricks in the Attic", the first song from his third studio album Hood Baby 2. On April 23, 2020, Gotit eventually released the Hood Baby 2 album. The album features artists including Gunna, Future, Lil Keed, and Lil Yachty.

On August 10, 2020, Gotit released his collaborative single "What It Was" with Future, accompanied with a music video for his then-upcoming album Crazy But It's True 2, which was later renamed to Top Chef Gotit.

On March 17, 2021, Gotit released his single "Wok", accompanied with a music video ahead of his fourth studio album, Top Chef Gotit, which was released on June 10, 2021.

On December 8, 2021, Gotit released his collaborative single "Walk Down" with CEO Trayle, Lil Double 0, and late rapper Biggz, which was accompanied with a music video.

On May 4, 2022, Gotit released his fifth studio album, The Cheater.

On June 28, 2022, Gotit released his single "MF Trimm", which was Lil Keed's favourite song and thus was released as a tribute to Lil Keed, who died a month before.

Live performances 
Lil Gotit performed at the Audiomack stage at the Rolling Loud Festival on May 10, 2019, in Miami, Florida performing on the same stage as Lil Durk,  Juice Wrld, Rich the Kid, and others. On September 14, 2019, Lil Gotit and Lil Keed performed at The Novo theater in Los Angeles. Fellow rappers Drake, Lil Duke, and Young Thug were also present on stage throughout the performance. He performed at the Rolling Loud Festival in Oakland on September 29, 2019. On October 12, 2019, Gotit performed in the Rolling Loud New York festival and performed at the A3C Festival in Atlanta the next day.

Discography

Studio albums

Mixtapes

Collaborative mixtapes

Collaborative extended plays

Singles

As a lead artist

As a featured artist

References 

Rappers from Atlanta
Living people
Mumble rappers
21st-century American singers
American hip hop musicians
21st-century African-American male singers
21st-century American male singers
1999 births